Koen Ridder (born 14 March 1985) is a Dutch badminton player. The left handler Ridder, was a part of the Duinwijck badminton club. He won the men's doubles title at the national championships in 2009, 2011, and 2013 partnered with Ruud Bosch. Together with Bosch, they won some international tournament in Portugal, Belgium, Canada, Slovenia, Norway, Peru and Tahiti. He also play for the Düren 57 club in German. His parents, Rob and Marjan Ridder also a professional badminton players.
Koen Ridder was elected vice-chair of the athlete commission of the BWF for a 4-year term in May 2015. In 2017 Ridder was chosen as Chair by his fellow commission members. He achieved his personal best world ranking of 22 in 2013.  Koen retired as a professional player in 2014 after representing The Netherlands for more than 10 years at international level.

Achievements

BWF International Challenge/Series 
Men's doubles

  BWF International Challenge tournament
  BWF International Series tournament

References

External links 

Living people
1985 births
Sportspeople from Haarlem
Dutch male badminton players
20th-century Dutch people
21st-century Dutch people